Lavad Voraong (30 March 1891 – 5 December 1893), was the Princess of Siam. She was a daughter of Chulalongkorn.

Her mother was The Noble Consort Luean, (née Niyavananda), daughter of Lord (Phra) Narindrabhorn and Prik Niyavananda. She had a younger full brother,  Prince Urubongs Rajsombhoj.

Princess Lavad Voraong died on 5 December 1893, at the age of 2.

Ancestry

1891 births
1893 deaths
People from Bangkok
19th-century Thai royalty who died as children
19th-century Chakri dynasty
Thai female Phra Ong Chao
Children of Chulalongkorn
Daughters of kings